Alexander Elliot Anderson Salmond (born 31 December 1954) is a Scottish politician and economist who served as First Minister of Scotland from 2007 to 2014. A prominent figure in the Scottish nationalist movement, he has served as leader of the Alba Party since 2021. Salmond was leader of the Scottish National Party (SNP), on two occasions, from 1990 to 2000 and from 2004 to 2014. He served as the party's depute leader from 1987 to 1990.

A graduate of the University of St Andrews, he worked as an economist in the Scottish Office, and later, the Royal Bank of Scotland. He was elected to the British House of Commons in 1987, serving as the Member of Parliament (MP) for Banff and Buchan from 1987 to 2010. In 1990, he successfully defeated Margaret Ewing in the SNP leadership contest. Salmond led the party through the first election to the Scottish Parliament in 1999, where the SNP emerged as the second largest party, with Salmond as the Leader of the Opposition. He was elected as the Member of the Scottish Parliament (MSP) for Banff and Buchan in that year's election. He resigned as leader in 2000 and stood down as an MSP the following year, when he was appointed leader of the SNP's Westminster group. Salmond was re-elected as leader of the SNP in the 2004 leadership contest, after running on a joint ticket with Nicola Sturgeon. She led the SNP at Holyrood until Salmond was elected to the Scottish Parliament in 2007 for the Gordon (later Aberdeenshire East). The SNP placed first, ahead of the governing Labour Party, in the 2007 election with Salmond securing a confidence and supply support from the Scottish Greens, resulting in Salmond's appointment as first minister.

Salmond led an SNP minority government in his first term. His government passed landmark legislation including the abolishment of university tuition fees, the scrapping of prescription charges and commitment to renewable energy. Salmond was the first nationalist first minister and in his first term he failed to obtain support for a referendum on Scottish independence due to insufficient support. At the 2011 Scottish Parliament election the SNP won with an overall majority, a feat previously thought almost impossible under the additional member system used in elections for the Scottish Parliament. As of 2021, this is the only election in which a party has won a majority in the Scottish Parliament. Salmond used this mandate to hold a referendum, which led to the signing of the Edinburgh Agreement and the 2014 referendum. The Yes Scotland campaign, which his deputy Nicola Sturgeon led, lost the campaign as a majority of Scots voted against leaving the United Kingdom. As a result, Salmond resigned and was succeeded by Sturgeon.

Returning to Westminster, Salmond was elected MP for Gordon in the 2015 general election. He was the SNP International Affairs and Europe spokesperson from 2015 to 2017. He left the House of Commons at the 2017 general election after losing his seat to the Scottish Conservative Party candidate Colin Clark. In August 2018, Salmond resigned from the party to fight allegations of sexual misconduct which he denied. In January 2019, he was charged with 14 offences, including attempted rape and sexual assault, but was compensated £500,000 by the Scottish Government in August 2019 and later acquitted of all charges after trial in March 2020. In 2021, he criticised Sturgeon for her government's flawed investigations into these allegations which resulted in a political scandal. Salmond later was announced as the leader of a new pro-independence party, the Alba Party. The party failed to gain any seats in the 2021 national and 2022 local elections.

Early life

Early years and family background 

Alexander Elliot Anderson Salmond was born in his parents' home at 101 Preston Road, Linlithgow, West Lothian, Scotland, on 31 December 1954. He is the second of four children born to Robert Fyfe Findlay Salmond (1921–2017), and Mary Stewart Salmond (née Milne; 1922–2003), both of whom were civil servants. Robert Salmond, who served in the Royal Navy during the Second World War, had originally worked as an electrician, and his family had been resident in Linlithgow since the mid-18th century. Salmond's grandmother, Abigail Ireland, married Alexander Salmond, one of six children to Robert Dobie Salmond and Margaret Elms, the daughter of Margaret Duncan and Henry Elms, a native of England.

Salmond's middle names come from his family's tradition of naming their children after the local Church of Scotland minister, in this case Gilbert Elliot Anderson of St Ninian's Craigmailen Parish Church in Linlithgow. He remains a member of the Church of Scotland.

From a young age, Salmond suffered very bad asthma. His parents were loving and caring and although he did not grow up poor, "money was tight" and the importance of education was emphasised in the family. Salmond was a skinny child, often referred to by his father as a "skink", as in Cullen Skink.

Education 
Salmond was educated at Linlithgow Primary School, before attending Linlithgow Academy from 1966 to 1972. He studied at Edinburgh College of Commerce from 1972 to 1973, gaining an HNC in Business Studies, and was then accepted by the University of St Andrews, where he studied Economics and Medieval History. During his time at St Andrews, Salmond lived in Andrew Melville Hall. He was elected as vice-president (education) of the students' representative council in 1977 and was also nominated to join St Andrews Community Council that year. Salmond graduated with a 2:2 Joint Honours MA in Economics and Medieval History in May 1978.

Early career 
After graduating in 1978, he entered the Government Economic Service as an assistant economist in the Department of Agriculture and Fisheries for Scotland, part of the now defunct Scottish Office. Two years later he joined the staff of the Royal Bank of Scotland, where he worked for seven years, initially as an assistant economist. In 1982 he was appointed oil economist, and from 1984 he worked as a bank economist as well as continuing to hold the position of oil economist. While with the Royal Bank, he wrote and broadcast extensively for both domestic and international outlets. He also contributed regularly to oil and energy conferences. In 1983, Salmond created a "Royal Bank/BBC oil index" that is still used.

Early political years
Salmond became active in the SNP when he joined the Federation of Student Nationalists at the University of St Andrews in 1973. His conversion is generally credited to his then girlfriend, Debbie Horton, an English student from London, who was secretary of the St Andrews University Labour club. After an argument in December 1973, she told him: "If you feel like that, go and join the bloody SNP". The next day Salmond did. The following day he and a friend attended the sparsely populated AGM of the university branch of the Federation of Student Nationalists. Being the only two fully paid-up members of the SNP at the university, they were duly elected president and treasurer. Although a left-winger at the time he joined, Salmond had considerable doubts as to whether or not the Labour Government would legislate for a devolved Scottish Assembly.

Salmond started his political life as a committed left-winger inside the SNP and was a leading member of the socialist republican organisation within it, the 79 Group. He was, along with other group leaders, suspended from membership of the SNP when the 79 Group was banned within the larger party. In 1981, he married Moira French McGlashan, then a senior civil servant with the Scottish Office.

Following the SNP's National Council narrowly voting to uphold the expulsion, Salmond and the others were allowed back into the party a month later, and in 1985 he was elected as the SNP's Vice Convener for Publicity. In 1987 he stood for Parliament in Banff and Buchan and defeated the incumbent Conservative MP, Albert McQuarrie. Later that year Salmond became Senior Vice Convener (Depute Leader) of the SNP. He was at this time still viewed as being firmly on the left of the party and had become a key ally of Jim Sillars, who joined him in the House of Commons when he won a by-election for the seat of Glasgow Govan in 1988. Salmond served as a member of the House of Commons Energy Select committee from 1987 to 1992.

Leadership of the Scottish National Party

First Tenure: 1990–2000 

When Gordon Wilson stood down as SNP leader in 1990, Salmond decided to contest the leadership. His only opponent was Margaret Ewing, whom Sillars decided to support. This caused considerable consternation amongst the SNP left as the two main left leaders were opposing each other in the contest. Salmond went on to win the leadership election by 486 votes to Ewing's 146.

His first test as leader was the general election in 1992, with the SNP having high hopes of making an electoral breakthrough. Whilst considerably increasing its share of the vote, it failed to win a large number of seats. Sillars lost his, causing him to describe the Scottish people as '90-minute patriots'. This comment ended the political friendship between Salmond and Sillars, and Sillars would soon become a vocal critic of Salmond's style of leadership.

The SNP increased its number of MPs from four to six in the 1997 general election, which saw a landslide victory for the Labour Party. After election, Labour legislated for a devolved Scottish parliament in Edinburgh. Although still committed to a fully independent Scotland, Salmond signed the SNP up to supporting the campaign for devolution, and, along with Scottish Labour leader Donald Dewar and Scottish Liberal Democrat leader Jim Wallace, played an active part in securing the victory for devolution in the Scotland referendum of 1997. Many hardline fundamentalists in the SNP objected to committing the party to devolution, as it was short of full political Scottish independence.

Salmond's first spell as leader was characterised by a moderation of his earlier left-wing views and by his firmly placing the SNP into a gradualist, but still pro-independence, strategy. Salmond was one of the few politicians in the UK to oppose the NATO bombing of Serbia in 1999. He was opposed to the conflict because it was not authorised by a United Nations Security Council resolution, which was a controversial subject at the time. Despite this, Salmond was heavily criticised in the media for describing Tony Blair's decision to intervene militarily as an "unpardonable folly".

Several years as party leader earned Salmond an unusually high profile for an SNP politician in the London-based media. In 1998, Salmond won the Spectator Award for Political Strategist of the Year. Following an appearance on the entertainment programme Call My Bluff, Salmond used one of the 'bluff' cards that are used as props in the show in the run-up to the first elections to the Scottish Parliament. To counter his frustration at having to sit in silence through what he claimed was an inappropriately political speech by Tony Blair at a charity lunch, he held up the bluff card as the Prime Minister began querying Scotland's economic prospects should independence occur. Throughout his time in politics, Salmond has maintained his interest in horse racing, writing a weekly column for The Scotsman and appearing a number of times on Channel 4's The Morning Line. During the election campaign, Salmond was photographed feeding a young supporter a Solero ice cream during an event at Stirling University, creating a photograph that would become iconic.

Resignation as leader 
Salmond was elected to the Scottish Parliament in 1999 and was one of its highest-profile members as Leader of the Opposition. He stood down as SNP leader in 2000, facing internal criticism after a series of high-profile fall-outs with party members, and was replaced by his preferred successor John Swinney, who defeated Alex Neil for the post. He resigned from the Scottish Parliament on 14 May 2001 to lead the SNP group in the House of Commons.

During the prolonged parliamentary debates in the run-up to the 2003 invasion of Iraq he voiced strong opposition to the UK's participation. In the aftermath of the war, he lent support to the attempt of Adam Price, a Plaid Cymru MP, to impeach Tony Blair over the Iraq issue. Salmond has gone further than many anti-war politicians in claiming that Blair's statements on the presence of weapons of mass destruction in Iraq were consciously intended to deceive the public. He has also claimed that Blair had made a pact with George W. Bush "to go to war come what may".

Subsequent return 

After the June 2004 European Parliament elections, which were perceived as a "disaster" for the SNP, pressure mounted on Swinney to resign as leader. Swinney announced his resignation on 22 June 2004 to become Convener of the Scottish Parliament's European and External Relations Committee.

On 15 July 2004, Salmond said that he would be a candidate in the forthcoming election for the leadership of the SNP. This came as a surprise because he had previously declared that he would definitely not be a leadership candidate. In the postal ballot of all members he went on to receive over 75% of the votes cast, placing him well ahead of his nearest rival Roseanna Cunningham. As he was not an MSP at the time, his depute, Nicola Sturgeon, took over as Leader of the SNP group and the main opposition leader at Holyrood. Although he was re-elected in the 2005 general election, he made clear his intention to return to the Scottish Parliament at the 2007 Scottish parliamentary election in an attempt to win power for the first time.

2007 Scottish Parliament election 
Salmond led the Scottish National Party through the 2007 election to the 3rd Scottish Parliament. In the election, Salmond stood as a candidate for the Gordon constituency, which had been represented since 1999 by the Liberal Democrat Nora Radcliffe. Salmond won the seat with 41% of the vote, and a majority of 2,062, returning to the Scottish Parliament after six years' absence. In the election the SNP emerged as the largest party, winning 47 seats to Labour's 46.

Having won more seats than any other party in the 2007 Scottish Parliament election, the SNP initially approached the Scottish Liberal Democrats to form a coalition, but they declined to take part in negotiations. This left the SNP without any possibility to form a coalition with an overall majority. Ultimately, the Scottish Green Party agreed to vote in an SNP minority government in return for concessions on climate policy and naming a Green to chair a committee.

First Minister of Scotland

First term: 2007–2011 

On 16 May 2007, with the support of the Greens, Salmond was elected by the Parliament to succeed Jack McConnell as First Minister of Scotland. The following day he received the Royal Warrant from the Queen and was officially sworn into office at the Court of Session in Edinburgh. Under section 45(7) of the Scotland Act 1998 he became Keeper of the Great Seal of Scotland at the same time. He was appointed to the British Privy Council four weeks later. Salmond became the first nationalist politician to hold the office of First Minister. He appointed Sturgeon as his Deputy First Minister.

Entering government 

Salmond reduced the size of the Cabinet from nine members to six, and said he would seek to govern on a "policy by policy" basis. In order to concentrate on his new role as First Minister, Salmond stood down as the SNP group leader at Westminster and was replaced by Angus Robertson. The Guardian reported in November 2007 that Salmond believed Scotland would be independent within "the next decade".

2007 Glasgow Airport attacks 

Salmond had been First Minister for just over a month when a vehicle rammed the front entrance of the main terminal building at Glasgow Airport on 30 June 2007, the first terrorist attack in Scotland since the Lockerbie bombing incident in December 1988. In a statement addressing the attacks in Glasgow, Salmond stated "terrorist acts are the work of individuals not communities and the arrival of terror on our soil must not result in racist attacks on ethnic minorities whose only crime is to share the same religion and colour as the bombers. It is to be hoped that yesterday's attack is an isolated incident, but the reality is that we will have to deal with more in the future. We must not allow terrorists to stop us from going about our lives as we always have – to do so would be to hand a victory to the men of terror."

Salmond issued a statement regarding the attacks in Edinburgh, calling for "the need for vigilance and unity against the forces of terror and rightly praised the work of the emergency services". Salmond called a meeting of the Scottish Government security advisers in St Andrew's House in Edinburgh, followed by a request from the Prime Minister Gordon Brown for Salmond, the Cabinet Secretary for Justice Kenny MacAskill and the Lord Advocate Elish Angiolini to attend an emergency COBRA meeting. By the evening of 30 June, Salmond had attended an online conference discussion with the Prime Minister of the United Kingdom Gordon Brown and his governmental cabinet.

Scottish Independence proposals 

A white paper for an independence referendum, setting out four possible options ranging from no change to full independence, was published by the Scottish Government on 30 November 2009. A draft bill for public consultation was published on 25 February 2010, setting out a two-question yes/no referendum, proposing further devolution or full independence. The SNP failed to obtain support from other parties and withdrew the draft bill.

Expense controversy 
A newspaper investigation in 2009 revealed that Salmond had claimed as expenses from the UK parliament "up to £400 per month in food without producing receipts, even after becoming First Minister and spending little time at Westminster". In the same year, he stated that he would repay more than £700 that he had received in moving expenses when he left a London flat in 2007.

2010 UK General Election debates 
Salmond said it would be "unacceptable" for the SNP to be excluded from the 2010 UK election televised debate and sought "guarantees of inclusion from the broadcasters, given their inescapable duty to ensure fairness and impartiality in election-related coverage in Scotland" in the build up to the 2010 UK general election. The party used the Freedom of Information Act to see whether the BBC could have broken its own rules. Salmond said it was unacceptable to Scotland as well as to the SNP for the broadcasters to exclude the party that formed the Scottish Government and was leading in Westminster election polls. He emphasised that he was not trying to stop any debates from being broadcast. After having failed to change the BBC's decision to not include the SNP in the final British debate, in line with the decision by ITV and Sky News, the SNP mounted a legal challenge to the BBC at the Court of Session in Edinburgh. Despite earlier reassurances by the SNP that it was not trying to stop the broadcast, it sought an 'interim interdict' to prevent the debate being broadcast without the participation of the SNP. The Court of Session dismissed the SNP's complaint, and refused to ban the BBC from broadcasting the third debate in Scotland, on the grounds that the SNP had left the bringing of the case "far too late", had not contested the broadcasting of the first two debates by ITV and Sky Television, and that the third debate would in any case be broadcast by Sky on satellite across Britain, which a Scottish court had no power to block. The judge ordered the SNP to pay the BBC's legal expenses. The SNP's political opponents described the SNP's contesting of the case as a "stunt".

There were Scottish debates dealing with specifically devolved issues which Salmond had accepted the invitation to attend along the other parties within the Scottish Parliament on Sky TV. Salmond declined to attend those held on the BBC and ITV, and Angus Robertson agreed to take his place in the other debates.

Renewable energy 

Salmond in his 2010 New Year message highlighted the importance of sustainable development and renewable energy in Scotland and the required increase in powers of the Scottish Parliament needed to help harness Scotland's green energy potential and therefore take full advantage of the "renewable revolution".

Earlier, in December 2009, he campaigned for climate change legislation at the UN Climate Change Conference in Copenhagen to promote Scotland's role in tackling and mitigating climate change. This included signing a Partnership Agreement with the Maldives, one of the most exposed countries to the consequences of rising sea levels.

Although energy is mostly a matter reserved to Westminster, administrative devolution of Sections 36 & 37 of the Electricity Act 1989 coupled with fully devolved planning powers enabled the Scottish Government to establish Scotland as a leader in renewable energy developments.

2011 Scottish Parliament election 
Before the 2011 Scottish election, the SNP again pledged to hold an independence referendum if it won another term.  The Westminster Labour government had initially designed the additional member system to make it impossible for one party to win an outright majority, but the SNP won enough seats from the other parties to take 69 seats, a majority of four. At this election, Salmond was re-elected for Aberdeenshire East, essentially a reconfigured version of Gordon.

Second term: 2011–2014 

The SNP's overall majority assured Salmond of another term as First Minister, and he was re-elected unopposed on 18 May 2011. It also gave Salmond the ability to call a referendum on Scottish independence.  On 10 January 2012, the Scottish Government announced that they intended to hold the referendum in late 2014.

On 7 November 2012, Salmond surpassed the 2,001-day term of his predecessor, Jack McConnell.

An agreement was signed on 15 October 2012 by David Cameron and Salmond which provided a legal framework for the referendum to be held, and on 21 March 2013 the SNP government announced that the referendum would be held on 18 September 2014. Scotland's Future, a white paper setting out the Scottish Government's vision for an independent Scotland, was published on 26 November 2013.

Spending criticism 

In December 2011, Salmond spent £260 on a pair of trews that he wore to a ball in China. He refunded the taxpayer more than a year later, after a newspaper had submitted a freedom of information request. The sequence in which these events occurred was acknowledged by the Scottish Government after 7 months, during which they initially maintained that they had no record of when Salmond had repaid the money. In September 2012 he stayed with his wife at a hotel in Chicago while attending a golf tournament; the £3,000 for four nights was paid for by the taxpayer and supported a VisitScotland delegation that spent £468,580 on the trip as part of preparations for hosting the same tournament two years later. Salmond responded to a freedom of information request for information on his spending six months after receiving it, and referred to it as "ridiculous frippery".

In 2012, Salmond indicated in a television interview that he had sought the advice of his law officers on whether an independent Scotland would be part of the European Union. The following year, it was revealed that the Scottish Government had spent almost £20,000 to prevent the disclosure of the content of the alleged legal advice, even though no such advice existed.

Salmond has faced scrutiny for his closeness to Rupert Murdoch.

Donald Trump 
Salmond was an early supporter of then-future US President Donald Trump's controversial plans for a Trump International golf course in Aberdeenshire. After the plans were rejected by Aberdeenshire council Salmond personally met with Trump Organisation executives in Aberdeen. The next day the decision was made to overrule the council's rejection. The relationship turned fractious when in 2015, the UK Supreme Court rejected Trump's bid to stop an offshore wind farm being built close to one of his two golf resorts in Scotland. Trump has twice lost bids in the Scottish courts to halt the development, leading Salmond to describe him as a "three times loser", to which Trump called Salmond a "totally irrelevant has-been". Salmond has also said that Trump's impact in Scotland – in particular Turnberry, the Ayrshire golf resort he bought in 2014 – has had a "damaging impact" on the Scottish economy. These comments came days after the chief executive of the Professional Golfer's Association said Trump's comments on the presidential campaign trail were "not a positive thing for golf".

In January 2016, Salmond, prompted by broadcasting colleague Iain Dale, called Trump a "chicken" for refusing to appear on his LBC talk show, which had then been recently launched. Of Trump, he said: "The Donald tries to give this impression that he's totally off the cuff; in fact his media operation controls him and protects him from tough interviews, and when he's had tough interviews he hasn't liked it, that's been pretty obvious".

Edinburgh Agreement 

An agreement was signed on 15 October 2012 by David Cameron and Salmond which provided a legal framework for the referendum to be held, and on 21 March 2013 the SNP government announced that the referendum would be held on 18 September 2014. Scotland's Future, a white paper setting out the Scottish Government's vision for an independent Scotland, was published on 26 November 2013.

Resignation as First Minister 

On 19 September 2014, following the results of the independence referendum which confirmed a majority of the Scottish people had voted against independence, Salmond announced that he would be resigning as First Minister in November 2014. On 15 October, Deputy First Minister Nicola Sturgeon was the only candidate to stand for the leadership, and formally succeeded Salmond as SNP leader following the party's national conference in Perth on 14 November. Salmond submitted his resignation as First Minister to the Scottish Parliament and to the Queen on 18 November, and the formal selection of Sturgeon as his successor by the Scottish Parliament took place the following day.

Post-premiership

Return to Westminster, 2015–2017 
On 7 December 2014, Salmond announced that he would stand as the SNP candidate for the Westminster constituency of Gordon in the 2015 May election. He indicated that he did not intend to replace Angus Robertson, MP for Moray, as the SNP leader in the House of Commons. Nicola Sturgeon, his successor as SNP leader and First Minister, repeatedly reminded voters at the March 2015 SNP conference that she, not he, was party leader after he gave interviews about his possible role in a hung parliament. After he declared his candidacy, he was described as a "bogeyman" (both by Lesley Riddoch and by himself), and was reportedly "demonised" by "Conservative propaganda" portraying Labour Party leader Ed Miliband "compliantly dancing to Salmond the piper's tune" after the election.

During the election campaign, Salmond recorded in his diary: "The Tory candidate, Colin Clark, cuts an impressive figure but his politics are far too dry for this area. If the constituency were composed entirely of michty fairmers then he might be the ideal candidate. But it isn't and he is not."

Salmond gained the seat of Gordon with 47.7% of the vote replacing the Liberal Democrat's Malcolm Bruce as the constituency's Westminster MP
. On 13 May 2015, Salmond was appointed as the SNP's foreign affairs spokesman in the House of Commons. He tweeted the party would advocate a "pro Europe", "pro developing world" and "against military adventurism" stance.

Following his return to the Commons he attracted media attention after telling Business Minister Anna Soubry during a debate, “Behave yourself, woman." Soubry said Salmond's attitude belonged, “firmly in the 19th century”. However, his then party leader, Nicola Sturgeon, defended the remarks and said, "It was in a boisterous House of Commons debate. The fundamental question, ‘does that language indicate that Alex Salmond is sexist?’ Absolutely not, there's no man I know who is less sexist.”

In the 2017 British general election, Salmond's seat was widely watched as a potential Tory gain amid a nationwide backlash to Nicola Sturgeon's decision to call for a second independence referendum. The Scottish Conservatives had taken the most votes in the area at the 2017 local council elections, prompting party leader Ruth Davidson to say on a visit to Inverurie that, "We won the local government election in Gordon this week, beating the SNP into second place. It means that in this seat, as in many others, it is a two-horse race between us and the nationalists." In response to Davidson's comments, Salmond riposted, “It's just arrogance, for Ruth Davidson to continue the line of ‘we're going to take this seat, and we're going to take that seat’. Once it doesn't happen, it's very bad news for Ruth Davidson's credibility.”

On election night Salmond lost his seat as member for Gordon to Colin Clark of the Conservatives, receiving 19,254 votes to the Conservatives' 21,861. This represented a swing of 20.4% away from Salmond, larger than the 14.4% swing to him from the Liberal Democrats which saw him win the seat in the 2015 election. It also marked first time since the 1987 general election that Salmond was not in an elected position in either the British or Scottish parliament.

The Alex Salmond Show
 
On 9 November 2017, the RT channel (formerly known as Russia Today) announced he would host a show called The Alex Salmond Show on the network. Salmond's successor as Scotland's first minister and SNP leader, Nicola Sturgeon, said she would have advised against his decision to broadcast for the channel. Salmond was criticised by Scottish politicians from the other parties for a perceived lack of judgement. The first show was broadcast on 16 November 2017; the main interviewee was Carles Puigdemont, the former president of Catalonia.

In February 2022, Salmond announced that his show on RT has been suspended following the 2022 Russian invasion of Ukraine

Sexual misconduct allegations and subsequent investigations

Trial and acquittal

In August 2018, he resigned from the SNP in the face of allegations of sexual misconduct in 2013 while he was First Minister. In a statement he said that he wanted to avoid internal division within the party and intended to apply to rejoin the SNP once he had an opportunity to clear his name.

On 30 August 2018, he launched a crowdfunding appeal to pay for the legal costs of seeking a judicial review into the fairness of the process by which the Scottish Government has handled the allegations. He closed the appeal two days later, on 1 September, after raising £100,000, double the amount he wanted to pay for his legal costs. The government later conceded that its procedures had been flawed and paid more than £500,000 in Salmond's legal expenses. On 8 January 2019, he won his inquiry case against Scottish government, noting, "while I am glad about the victory which has been achieved today, I am sad that it was necessary to take this action." The Scottish government admitted it breached its own guidelines by appointing an investigating officer who had "prior involvement" in the case. Salmond also asked permanent secretary to the Scottish Government, Leslie Evans, to consider her position. Evans stated that the complaints the government had received in January 2018 had not been withdrawn, so the option of re-investigating them remained on the table, once the police probe into the allegations had run its course.

On 24 January 2019, Police Scotland arrested Salmond, and he was charged with 14 offences, including two counts of attempted rape, nine of sexual assault, two of indecent assault, and one of breach of the peace. He appeared in court on 21 November and entered a plea of "not guilty". The trial started on 9 March 2020; his defence was led by Gordon Jackson, and the prosecution was led by Alex Prentice.

On 23 March 2020, Salmond was cleared of all charges. A jury found him not guilty of 12 charges, one charge was dropped by prosecutors earlier in the trial while one charge was found not proven.

In May 2021 The Times reported that Salmond was writing a book about his trial.

Scottish Government Handling of Harassment Complaints
The Scottish Parliament set up the Committee on the Scottish Government Handling of Harassment Complaints to investigate how the Government breached its own guidelines in its original investigation into the harassment claims against Salmond, and then lost a judicial review into their actions and had to pay over £500,000 to Salmond for legal expenses. A political row developed over what evidence to this committee Salmond could present. Giving evidence in person in February 2021, Salmond claimed that senior figures in the Scottish Government and the SNP plotted to remove him from public life and to send him to prison. Sturgeon disputed the allegations.

Sturgeon initially told parliament that she had first heard of the complaints against Salmond when he told her of them on 2 April 2018. However, 18 months later, she revised her account, saying she had forgotten about an earlier meeting, on 29 March 2018, in which Salmond's former chief of staff Geoff Aberdein told her about the complaints. Critics have described this as a possible breach of the ministerial code, which states that any minister who deliberately misleads parliament should resign. The 29 March meeting was not recorded: meetings on government business are meant to be recorded, but Sturgeon has said this is because it was an SNP meeting. In his evidence to the committee, Salmond said there was "no doubt" that Sturgeon had broken the ministerial code in not revealing the 29 March meeting sooner and in not recording what was really a meeting about government business. Sturgeon denies any wrongdoing.

Documents and emails published on 2 March 2021 showed that two people supported Salmond's assertion that the meeting was convened as a government, not party, matter. The publication also backed up Salmond's allegation that the identity of one of his accusers had been passed to his former chief of staff, contradicting Sturgeon's statement that "to the very best of my knowledge I do not think that happened". They also confirmed that the government had pursued the legal case against Salmond after being advised by lawyers that it was likely to fail.

The Times reported that MSPs also heard that staff felt, "shamed because they were expected to tie Salmond's shoelaces, straighten his tie, apply hand sanitiser to him and comb his hair and remove dandruff."

Irish lawyer James Hamilton conducted a separate investigation into whether Sturgeon breached the ministerial code and concluded that she did not; caveating that: "It is for the Scottish parliament to decide whether they were in fact misled."

Alba Party
On 26 March 2021, Salmond announced he had joined and become leader of the Alba Party, a new pro-independence party, to contest the upcoming 2021 Scottish Parliament Election. While campaigning, he told The New Yorker that he did not want to destroy Nicola Sturgeon. "If I wanted to destroy her, that could have been done," he claimed. The party won zero seats but Salmond pledged the party would continue campaigning. He also claimed that the party had established itself as a political force in only six weeks and would remain on the political scene.

Alba also fielded 111 candidates at the 2022 Scottish local elections, including thirteen who had defected since 2017, but none of them won a seat. The following week, Salmond stated that all pro-independence parties needed to work together if Scottish independence was to be achieved. He said that the proposed 2023 independence referendum would need to take place, but if it didn't then there would be huge political change in Scotland in which Alba would play a strong part.

Personal life
Salmond married Moira McGlashan in 1981. Moira was a senior civil servant 17 years his senior, and became his boss when he joined the Scottish Office in the 1970s. They have no children. They closely protect their private lives and live in a converted mill in Strichen, Aberdeenshire.

Salmond is a member of the Church of Scotland and considers himself to be a religious man.

Salmond's main interests outside of work and politics are golf, horse racing, football and reading. He succeeded Robin Cook as a racing tipster for Glasgow's Herald newspaper. He supports the Scotland national football team and Heart of Midlothian FC, and sometimes attends matches. He takes an interest in Scottish cultural life, as well as watching Star Trek and listening to country music.

Honorary degrees and awards
Salmond has been awarded several honorary degrees in recognition of his political career. These include a doctorate from the University of St Andrews on 30 November 2007 and he was awarded the degree of Doctor of the University (D.Univ.) of the University of Glasgow on 20 April 2015.

In November 2007, Salmond received The Spectator's Parliamentarian of the Year award for his "brilliant campaign" and "extraordinary victory" in the Scottish Parliament elections, thereby ending eight years of Labour rule.

References

Further reading

Biographies
 David Torrance,  Salmond: Against The Odds , Birlinn, 2010

Other

External links

 
 First Minister (Scotland.gov.uk)
 Official biography (www.snp.org)
 Guardian profile, Electoral history and profile (guardian.co.uk)
 TheyWorkForYou.com
 Voting Record — Alex Salmond MP, Banff & Buchan (10525) (The Public Whip)
 

|-

|-

|-

|-

|-

|-

|-

|-

|-

 
1954 births
Alumni of the University of St Andrews
First Ministers of Scotland
Leaders of the Scottish National Party
Living people
Members of the Privy Council of the United Kingdom
Members of the Scottish Parliament 1999–2003
Members of the Scottish Parliament 2007–2011
Members of the Scottish Parliament 2011–2016
People acquitted of sex crimes
People educated at Linlithgow Academy
People from Linlithgow
People from West Lothian
NatWest Group people
Scottish nationalists
Scottish economists
Scottish National Party MPs
Scottish National Party MSPs
Scottish Presbyterians
UK MPs 1987–1992
UK MPs 1992–1997
UK MPs 1997–2001
UK MPs 2001–2005
UK MPs 2005–2010
UK MPs 2015–2017
RT (TV network) people
Scottish television talk show hosts
Alba Party politicians
Leaders of political parties in Scotland